The Caprices is a short story collection by Sabina Murray. It received the 2003 PEN/Faulkner Award for Fiction.

American short story collections
Asian-American short story collections
2002 short story collections
Literature by Asian-American women
Caprices
PEN/Faulkner Award for Fiction-winning works
Mariner Books books